Amselia heringi is a species of moth in the family Crambidae. The species was first described by Hans Georg Amsel in 1935, and is the type species of genus Amselia.

It is found in multiple countries in the Middle East, as well as Morocco. Its type locality is in Israel.

The forewing colour is variable.

Notes

References

Moths described in 1935
Moths of Asia
Crambinae
Taxa named by Hans Georg Amsel